Clash of the Titans may refer to:

Clash of the Titans (film series), a series of fantasy films about Ancient Greece
Clash of the Titans (1981 film), a fantasy film about the myth of Perseus
Clash of the Titans (2010 film), a remake of the 1981 film
Clash of the Titans (video game), a video game inspired by the 2010 film
Clash of the Titans (soundtrack), the soundtrack for the 2010 film
Wrath of the Titans, a sequel to the 2010 film
Clash of the Titans (tour), a metal concert tour
"Clash of the Titans", a song from Luca Turilli's Rhapsody's album Ascending to Infinity

See also
Battle of the Titans (disambiguation)
Crash of the Titans, a platform hack and slash game